The FS Class D.443 is a class of diesel-electric locomotive used in Italy, introduced in the late 1960s and still in service.

History
D.443 was ordered by the Italian state railways, Ferrovie dello Stato (FS), at the same time than the D.343, but requiring generally higher performances and multi-role capabilities. The two types shared the same hull and the single-motored bogies, which had been designed by FS. 30 units were to be built by FIAT, the remaining 20 by Breda. The D.443 were mainly to replace the old steam locomotives which were used for heavy freight trains on light, not-electrified lines.

Description
D.443 has one cab at each end, separated by two compartments including the engine-transmission pack and, in the other, the cooling devices. The two engines were both V-12,  of power, coupled to a DC 640/1080 V generator provided by Ansaldo.

Successors 
From 1974, the D.445 class was introduced, with an AC alternator. They also supplied electric train heating.

References

Sources

Bo′Bo′ locomotives
D.443
Railway locomotives introduced in 1967
Gio. Ansaldo & C. locomotives
Breda locomotives
Standard gauge locomotives of Italy